Dimethylamidophosphoric dichloride is an important chemical for few industrial purposes. It is used for synthesizing phosphoramidates as well as Nerve agent GA which is used as a chemical weapon.

Safety 
This chemical is also corrosive, flammable and will cause mild nerve agent symptoms if ingested or absorbed through skin due to its nature. It will react with water giving off hydrogen chloride vapors and dimethylamidophosphoric acid.

History 
First synthesis of the substance dates back to turn of the 19th century, when a student of German chemistry professor August Michaelis Ernst Ratzlaff made dimethylamidophosphoric dichloride as well as its diethyl analog for experiments of another PhD student of Michaelis Adolph Schall. He obtained a PhD at University of Rostock with a thesis titled Über die Einwirkung primärer und sekundärer Amine auf Phosphoroxychlorid und Äthoxylphosphoroxychlorid later in 1901. The high toxicity of the substance (as well as high toxicity of ethyl diethylaminocyanophosphonate, an analog of tabun synthesised by Schall) wasn't noticed at time, most likely due to the low yield of synthetic reactions used.

See also
 Organophosphate poisoning

References

Nerve agent precursors
Chlorides